Midnight Taxi is a 1937 American crime film directed by Eugene Forde and starring Brian Donlevy, Frances Drake and Alan Dinehart.

Plot
A federal agent poses as a taxi driver to infiltrate a gang of counterfeiters.

Cast
 Brian Donlevy as Charles 'Chick' Gardner  
 Frances Drake as Gilda Lee  
 Alan Dinehart as Philip Strickland 
 Sig Ruman as John B. Rudd  
 Gilbert Roland as Flash Dillon  
 Harold Huber as Walter 'Lucky' Todd  
 Paul Stanon as Agent J. W. McNeary  
 Lon Chaney Jr. as Detective Erickson  
 Russell Hicks as Barney Flagg  
 Regis Toomey as Hilton  
 Agnes Ayres as Society Woman 
 Joseph E. Bernard as Copy Reader 
 Edgar Dearing as Officer Murray  
 John Dilson as Doc Wilson 
 James Flavin as Detective McCormick  
 Creighton Hale as G-Man  
 Sherry Hall as Monte  
 Eddie Hart as Detective Morton  
 Otto Hoffman as Louie the Tailor  
 Frank Marlowe as Sailor  
 Paul McVey as Robert Powers  
 Frank Mills as Gas Station Attendant  
 Frank O'Connor as FBI Agent  
 Lee Phelps as Chief of Detectives  
 Arthur Rankin as Sailor
 Pedro Regas as Dazetta  
 Jeffrey Sayre as Buck  
 Harry Semels as Joe, Counterman  
 Harry Strang as FBI Agent  
 Zeffie Tilbury as Mrs. Lane  
 Hughey White as Newspaper Vendor  
 Norman Willis as Jefferson

References

Bibliography
 Smith, Don G. Lon Chaney, Jr.: Horror Film Star, 1906-1973. McFarland, 2004.

External links
 

1937 films
1937 crime films
1930s English-language films
American crime films
Films directed by Eugene Forde
20th Century Fox films
American black-and-white films
Films about taxis
Films scored by Samuel Kaylin
1930s American films